Centre-Val de Loire or Centre Region, as it was known until 2015, is one of the eighteen administrative regions of France. It straddles the middle Loire Valley in the interior of the country, with a population of 2,572,853 as of 2018. Its prefecture is Orléans, and its largest city is Tours.

Naming and etymology

First, the name  was chosen by the government purely on the basis of geography, in reference to its location in northwest-central France (the central part of the original French language area).

However, Centre is not situated in the geographical centre of France (except the Cher department); the name was criticised as being too dull and nondescript. A new logo was also created.

Geography

Bordering six other regions, Centre-Val-de-Loire borders the most of all eighteen regions in France. The bordering regions are Normandy on the northwest, Île-de-France on the northeast, Bourgogne-Franche-Comté on the east, Auvergne-Rhône-Alpes on the southeast, Nouvelle-Aquitaine on the southwest and Pays de la Loire on the west.

Departments
Centre-Val de Loire comprises six departments: Cher, Eure-et-Loir, Indre, Indre-et-Loire, Loir-et-Cher and Loiret.

Largest cities
Tours with 136,463 inhabitants (2018)
Orléans with 116,238 inhabitants (2018)
Bourges with 64,668 inhabitants (2018)
Blois with 45,871 inhabitants (2018)
Châteauroux with 43,442 inhabitants (2018)
Chartres with 38,426 inhabitants (2018)
Joué-lès-Tours with 38,250 inhabitants (2018), Tours Métropole Val de Loire
Dreux with 30,664 inhabitants (2018)
Vierzon with 25,725 inhabitants (2018)
Olivet with 22,168 inhabitants (2018), Orléans Métropole

Economy

The gross domestic product (GDP) of the region was 72.4 billion euros in 2018, accounting for 3.1% of French economic output. GDP per capita adjusted for purchasing power was 25,200 euros or 84% of the EU27 average in the same year. The GDP per employee was 99% of the EU average.

An economic development agency, called Centréco, was created in 1994 by the Regional Council of Centre to promote the inflow of investments and the establishment setting-up of new businesses French and foreign companies in the Centre region. This ensures a mission of economic promotion, international support to regional companies and enhancement promotion of regional agrofood products via a regional signature, du Centre.

Gallery

See also
Apremont-sur-Allier
Gargilesse-Dampierre
Lavardin
Montrésor
Saint-Benoît-du-Sault

Notes

References

External links

Centre : on the road of the châteaux - Official French website (in English)

Website of the agency for promotion and economic development of the Centre / Loire Valley region
About-France - overview of the region and main attractions
Experience Loire - information on the region and its departments

 
Regions of France
NUTS 2 statistical regions of the European Union
Centre region articles needing translation from French Wikipedia
States and territories established in 2015